Lifesaving is the act involving rescue, resuscitation and first aid.  It often refers to water safety and aquatic rescue; however, it could include ice rescue, flood and river rescue, swimming pool rescue and other emergency medical services.  Lifesaving also refers to sport where lifesavers compete based on skills, speed and teamwork.  Lifesaving activities specialized in oceanic environment is called surf lifesaving or coastal lifesaving.

Those who participate in lifesaving activities as a volunteer are called lifesavers, and those who are employed to professionally perform lifesaving activities are called lifeguards.

History

Origins

The first life saving organisation, the Royal National Institution for the Preservation of Life from Shipwreck, was established in England in 1824 by Sir William Hillary. While living on the Isle of Man in 1808, he became aware of the treacherous nature of the Irish Sea, with many ships being wrecked around the Manx coast. He soon drew up plans for a national lifeboat service manned by trained crews, but received little response from the Admiralty.

However, on appealing to the more philanthropic members of London society, the plans were adopted and, with the help of two members of Parliament (Robert Wilson and George Hibbert), the National Institution for the Preservation of Life from Shipwreck was founded in 1824.

One of the Institution's first rescues was of the packet St George, which had foundered on Conister Rock at the entrance to Douglas Harbour. Hillary took part in the successful operation and everyone was ultimately rescued. Thirty years later the Institution's title was changed to the Royal National Lifeboat Institution and the first of the new lifeboats to be built was stationed at Douglas in recognition of Hillary's work.

Spread

Similar services were established in other countries, in Belgium (1838), Denmark (1848), United States (1848), Sweden (1856), France (1865), Germany (1885), Turkey (1868), Russia (1872), Italy (1879) and Spain (1880). In 1891 the Royal Life Saving Society was created to affiliate British and Irish lifesaving and lifeguarding clubs.  It expanded its operations to Canada and Australia in 1894. In 1913 the DLRG was founded in Germany.

The first international lifesaving conference was held in Marseilles, France in 1878, but it was not until 1910 that the first international lifesaving organisation, FIS (Fédération Internationale de Sauvetage Aquatique), was founded.

In 1971 Australia, Great Britain, New Zealand, South Africa and the United States founded another international organization called World Life Saving (WLS). FIS and WLS merged into a new organisation, International Life Saving Federation (ILS) in 1993 with its headquarters in Leuven, Belgium.

International Life Saving Federation
The International Life Saving Federation (ILS) was established on 27 March 1910 in Paris, France. The ILS is primarily known as the world authority and head in the global effort to "prevent drowning and regroups national life saving organisations/federations aiming at improving water safety, water rescue, lifesaving and lifeguarding and lifesaving sport".

Activities
Surf lifesaving developed in Australia and is often simply called "lifesaving".  It focuses on drowning prevention and rescue in a coastal setting.  General lifesaving does not limit its activities to beaches - its aim is to promote water safety around ponds, lakes, rivers, pools, in the home, at school and in any other applicable environments. This is why landlocked countries like Switzerland, Austria, Kazakhstan, Macedonia, Serbia, Azerbaijan, Czech Republic and Slovakia, are also full members of ILS.

Lifesavers are volunteers and usually stationed at a club house. They provide training for lifesaver/lifeguard qualifications as well as educating the general public.

As a sport

Lifesaving has become a growing sport in many countries. The sport can be contested in swimming pools or on beaches in the surf, each being a separate discipline of the sport.

Lifesaving is one of the official sports of The World Games, a quadrennial multi-sport event for sports and disciplines that are not in the Olympic programme.

Cardiopulmonary resuscitation
Cardiopulmonary resuscitation, otherwise known as CPR is the most common form of life saving. CPR can be easily understood through this simplified table.

DRSABCD
All collapsed victims should be carefully assessed to decide what emergency care is needed. This method of assessment is known as DRSABCD, this method is explained in the following table.

See also

 Lifeguard
DLRG
 Commonwealth Pool Lifesaving Championships
 Rashtriya Life Saving Society (India)
 Royal Life Saving Society Australia
 Royal Life Saving Society Commonwealth
 Royal Life Saving Society of Canada
 Surf lifesaving
 Surf ski
 United States Lifesaving Association
 United States Life-Saving Service
 Adolph Kiefer

References

 
1824 establishments in England
Protective service occupations
English inventions